Ptycholoma lata is a species of moth of the family Tortricidae. It is found in Hunan province in southern China.

References

	

Moths described in 2009
Archipini